Kannappa (disambiguation) may refer to:
 Kannappa Nayanar, one of the 63 Nayanars
 Bedara Kannappa, a Kannada film
 Bhakta Kannappa, a Telugu film